Julia Charlotte Mengs (c. 1730 – after 1806) was a German painter.

Julia Charlotte was born in Bohemia, into the Lutheran family of Danish painter Ismael Mengs, a hofmaler (court painter) at the court of Saxonian-Polish electors and kings. She was the younger sister of Therese Maron and Anton Raphael Mengs, and also embarked on a career as a court painter. However, in 1765 she entered the Belvedere Convent in the March of Ancona, taking the name of Sister Maria Speranda. She died there sometime after 1806. No work by Julia appears to have survived, although a pastel portrait of her traditionally described as being by her sister has sometimes been suggested to be a self-portrait instead.

References

1730 births
Year of birth uncertain
Year of death unknown
German people of Danish descent
German women painters
18th-century German painters
18th-century German women artists
18th-century German Roman Catholic nuns
Sibling artists
Nuns and art
19th-century German Roman Catholic nuns